Al-Dawood Air was a cargo airline based in Lagos, Nigeria, operating worldwide cargo flights out of Ostend-Bruges International Airport, Belgium, and Murtala Mohammed International Airport, Lagos.

Al-Dawood Air was founded in 2002 as a subsidiary of the Al-Dawood Group, and ceased operations in 2005.

Fleet 
The Al-Dawood Air fleet consisted of only one Douglas DC-8 Series 63F aircraft.

References

Defunct airlines of Nigeria
Airlines established in 2002
Airlines disestablished in 2005
2005 disestablishments in Nigeria
Defunct companies based in Lagos
Nigerian companies established in 2002